Maslenica is a village in the municipality of Jasenice in Zadar County, Dalmatia, Croatia. Waters are quite clear due to the Zrmanja river which flows into this gulf.

History 

The village was built 1000 years ago.

Maslenica was damaged under the Croatian War of Independence in the 1990s. Most notably, a heavily traveled bridge, the Maslenica Bridge was destroyed. In 2006, the bridge was rebuilt on the same spot and similar appearance. In the meantime, an additional bridge, also known as Maslenica Bridge had been built slightly north, on the A1 motorway.

Operation Maslenica got its name from the village.

References 

Populated places in Zadar County
Populated coastal places in Croatia